Turkey oak is a common name for several species of oaks and may refer to:

Quercus cerris, native to southeastern Europe and Asia Minor
Quercus laevis, native to the southeastern United States

Quercus taxa by common names